Toshiyuki Kamioka  is a Japanese conductor and pianist, who lives and works predominantly in Germany since 1984.

Career 
Born in Tokyo, Toshiyuki Kamioka studied from 1979 to 1983 conducting, composition, piano and violin at the Tokyo National University of Fine Arts and Music, where he was awarded the Ataka prize in 1982. A scholarship of Rotary International enabled him to continue his studies at the Hochschule für Musik und Theater Hamburg with Klauspeter Seibel.

After positions in Kiel and at the Aalto Theatre in Essen Kamioka was appointed Generalmusikdirektor at the Hessisches Staatstheater Wiesbaden in 1996, where he worked until 2004. From 1998 to 2006 he was also Generalmusikdirektor of the Nordwestdeutsche Philharmonie in Herford. In January 2000 he conducted them in Einojuhani Rautavaara's Symphony No.7 (Angel of Light) in Detmold, Paderborn, Herford, Bad Salzuflen and Minden.

Since 2004 Kamioka has been Generalmusikdirektor of Wuppertal, from 2012 also conductor of the Opernhaus Wuppertal, and a professor for conducting at the Hochschule für Musik Saar in Saarbrücken. Since 2009 he has been also Generalmusikdirektor at the Saarländisches Staatstheater.

Kamioka has conducted as a guest the NHK Symphony Orchestra, the Bamberg Symphony and German radio orchestras.

In 2010 he was awarded the Von der Heydt Prize of the city of Wuppertal as conductor of the Symphony Orchestra Wuppertal.

References

External links 
 Toshiyuki Kamioka on the website of the Hochschule für Musik Saar (in German)
 Toshiyuki Kamioka on the website of the Saarländisches Staatstheater (in German)

1960 births
20th-century classical pianists
20th-century conductors (music)
20th-century Japanese male musicians
21st-century classical pianists
21st-century conductors (music)
21st-century Japanese male musicians
Academic staff of the Hochschule für Musik Saar
Hochschule für Musik und Theater Hamburg alumni
Japanese classical pianists
Japanese conductors (music)
Japanese male classical pianists
Japanese male conductors (music)
Living people
Tokyo University of the Arts alumni